Parc (French) or Park (Dutch) is a Brussels Metro station located beneath Brussels Park in central Brussels, Belgium. It has one entrance, at the intersection of the Rue Royale/Koningsstraat and the Rue de la Loi/Wetstraat, two of the main roads of the City of Brussels.

The station opened on 17 December 1969, as a premetro (underground tram) station on the tram line between De Brouckère and Schuman, and became a heavy metro station on 20 September 1976, serving former lines 1A and 1B. Following the reorganisation of the Brussels Metro on 4 April 2009, it is served by lines 1 and 5, which cross Brussels from east to west.

Several places of interest other than the park itself lie near this station: the Royal Palace, the Belgian House of Parliament (Palace of the Nation), the office of the Prime Minister of Belgium, the Royal Park Theatre, and the United States' embassy.

History
When the station was first built, there was a plan to eventually construct a connecting line along the route of the Rue Royale/Koningsstraat. To provide for this line, a much larger underground space was excavated than necessary for a simple station. The Rue Royale line was quickly cancelled, and the underground chambers intended for it now house the Brussels metro's traffic control centre.

The tunnel between Parc/Park and Arts-Loi/Kunst-Wet stations was the first section of the Brussels metro system to be built using a tunnelling shield. This was done as a test; most parts of the Brussels metro having been built using open construction methods.

References

External links

Brussels metro stations
Railway stations opened in 1969
City of Brussels